Kohl City (also known as Kohl) is community in Franklin County, in the U.S. state of Missouri. David Ernest Blankenship Jr. was elected mayor in 2014 when he purchased the entire city.

History
A post office called Kohl was established in 1892, and remained in operation until 1903. The community derives its name from the local Kohlbusch family.

References

Unincorporated communities in Franklin County, Missouri
Unincorporated communities in Missouri